3951 Zichichi, provisional designation , is a stony Florian asteroid and binary system from the inner regions of the asteroid belt, approximately 7 kilometers in diameter. It was discovered on 12 February 1986, by staff members at the San Vittore Observatory near Bologna, Italy, and named after physicist Antonino Zichichi.

Orbit and classification 

Zichichi is a S-type asteroid and member of the Flora family, one of the largest collisional populations of stony asteroids in the main-belt. It orbits the Sun in the inner main-belt at a distance of 1.9–2.7 AU once every 3 years and 7 months (1,307 days). Its orbit has an eccentricity of 0.17 and an inclination of 5° with respect to the ecliptic.

Physical characteristics 

A minor-planet moon was discovered orbiting at a distance of 16 km in 2006, but not announced until 2011.

Naming 

This minor planet was named after Italian nuclear physicist Antonino Zichichi. The approved naming citation was published by the Minor Planet Center on 20 May 1989.

References

External links 
 Asteroids with Satellites, Robert Johnston, johnstonsarchive.net
 Asteroid Lightcurve Database (LCDB), query form (info )
 Dictionary of Minor Planet Names, Google books
 Asteroids and comets rotation curves, CdR – Observatoire de Genève, Raoul Behrend
 Discovery Circumstances: Numbered Minor Planets (1)-(5000) – Minor Planet Center
 
 

003951
003951
Named minor planets
003951
19860213